The Zhili clique was one of several mutually hostile cliques or factions that split from the Beiyang clique during the Republic of China's Warlord Era. This fragmentation followed the death of Yuan Shikai, who was the only person capable of keeping the Beiyang Army together. It was named for the general region of the clique's base of power, Zhili Province, now Hebei, and during its height also controlled Jiangsu, Jiangxi, and Hubei.

Unlike other cliques, this one was formed by officers who felt discriminated against by Premier Duan Qirui in matters of appointment and promotions.  They rallied around President Feng Guozhang who had to share power with Duan's dominant Anhui clique in the Beiyang government. Lacking strong bonds, they were more willing to abandon or betray one another.

They advocated a softer line during the Constitutional Protection War. After Feng's natural death, leadership passed to Cao Kun. Cao was victorious in the Zhili–Anhui War (1920) though the credit belongs to his chief lieutenant, Wu Peifu, the greatest strategist in China at the time. Relations with the Fengtian clique, which gave nominal assistance against Anhui clique, deteriorated and Wu again brought victory during the First Zhili–Fengtian War (1922). In the next two years, the Zhili clique scored successive victories which led to Cao Kun's ascendency to the presidency via bribery. Cao's ambition brought all of his enemies against him and created dissent within the clique. Zhili might have won the Second Zhili–Fengtian War (1924) and eventually reunite all of China had it not been for Feng Yuxiang's betrayal with the Beijing Coup. Cao was imprisoned and leadership passed to Wu who along with Sun Chuanfang managed to hold central China for the next two years. During the Kuomintang's Northern Expedition, they created a desperate alliance with their former Fengtian enemies but were defeated entirely. The Zhili clique was the only warlord faction to be destroyed as a result of the Northern Expedition.

They were also strongly anti-Japanese. Western powers were sympathetic but provided no support with the exception of foreign private businesses who appreciated their adoption of an anti-communist and anti-union stance in 1923.  Wu Peifu had initially invited the Communists to end the Communications Clique's stranglehold over the railways but found the Communists to be a greater threat and put them down with violence.

See also
Warlord Era
List of Warlords
History of the Republic of China

References
 
 
 

Warlord cliques in Republican China
1927 disestablishments in China
Members of the Zhili Clique